Rodney Stephen Hull (13 August 1935 – 17 March 1999) was a British comedian and popular entertainer on television in the 1970s and 1980s. He rarely appeared without Emu, a mute and highly aggressive arm-length puppet modelled on the Australian bird.

Early life 
Hull was born on the Isle of Sheppey, Kent, England in 1935. He attended Delamark Road School and the County Technical School, Sheerness.  After national service with the RAF, he qualified as an electrician.

TV career

Australia 
Hull moved to Australia in 1956.  His first job in television was as a lighting technician with TCN Channel 9 in Sydney. He then began appearing on air, notably as Constable Clot in Channel 9's Kaper Kops with Reg Gorman and Desmond Tester, a regular segment in its children's afternoon programming. Clot proved very popular and soon gained his own segment, Clot in the Clouds, which depicted Constable Clot daydreaming about having other professions, such as a world-famous brain surgeon, 'Blood Clot.'

Later he worked with Marilyn Mayo as co-host of a children's breakfast TV programme, The Super Flying Fun Show, playing a wacky character named 'Caretaker Clot,' an extension of his Kaper Cops role. Hull first used Emu as a puppet in this show. There are conflicting reports as to how this came about: The 2003 Channel 4 documentary Rod Hull: A Bird in the Hand states bluntly, "In fact, Emu was a Channel Nine creation". Other sources cite a Channel Nine producer, Jim Badger, who said that he had requested a reluctant Hull to use Emu. Hull assigned to himself full authorship of Emu, stating, "Sure I found him in a cupboard, but I had put him there in the first place. I concocted him, nobody else."  The bird subsequently became a regular part of Hull's set on cabarets back in the United Kingdom and Australia.

Britain 
Hull returned to the UK in 1971 and signed with International Artists (after Emu tore up the office). Soon after, his Australian success translated to his native country with Hull appearing on several children's and adult light entertainment shows.

His first UK television appearance came on the ITV show Saturday Variety, but it was his appearance in the 1972 Royal Variety Performance that provided his springboard to national recognition.

Emu
Hull used Emu to create a kind of gleeful havoc, while not accepting blame for it. The simple, effective conceit of a false arm attached to Hull's jacket, which cradled the emu, made it appear that the neck and head moved of its own volition. This apparently independent movement gave the illusion that the bird had its own personality, which entailed sudden, unprovoked, and often violent attacks on anyone and anything that came too close. During these events Hull would make half-hearted attempts to pull the bird away from its victim but would often become embroiled in the fracas, rolling around on the floor, creating theatrical mayhem.

When Hull left The Super Flying Fun Show and Australia, a duplicate of Emu was made so the character could continue on the show, much to Hull's annoyance, and comedian Marty Morton took over Hull's co-hosting position in Australia.

Hull and Emu were regulars on The Hudson Brothers Razzle Dazzle Show, which aired for one season as a Saturday morning kids' show on American broadcaster CBS in 1974-75.

There were apparently no boundaries to Emu's outrageous behaviour. At least two people have publicly reported Hull's sexual assault of women using Emu as a cover. Darts champion Eric Bristow wrote: ‘He used the puppet to feel up women and stick his hand between people's legs.’ In a 2007 interview with Chortle, the late veteran comedy producer Michael Hurll said to Hull ’ "Look Rod, you’ve got your hand in that emu, up girls’ skirts and squeezing their tits; doing things you would get locked up for."

More common was Hull's physical assault of people and things using Emu. In 1972, Hull destroyed The Queen Mother's bouquet of flowers during the after-show line-up at the aforementioned Royal Variety Performance after which he appeared in many other shows. During 1976 Hull made his most famous appearances when Hull's Emu repeatedly attacked Michael Parkinson during his eponymous chat show, eventually causing the interviewer to fall off his chair. Fellow guest Billy Connolly threatened, "If that bird comes anywhere near me, I'll break its neck and your bloody arm!"  Perhaps mindful of his professional future, Hull swiftly curtailed his Emu behaviour. In later years, Parkinson later referred to it as "that bloody bird."

This led to his own television series Emu's Broadcasting Company (1975–1980), Emu's World, EMU TV and Emu's All Live Pink Windmill Show.

He was the subject of This Is Your Life in 1982 when he was surprised by Eamonn Andrews at Thames Television's Euston Road Studios. In 1983 he published a book of poetry.

Also in 1983 he appeared in the US on The Tonight Show, attacking host Johnny Carson, even after he was told not to by the producers, and Richard Pryor in one of the comedian's first public appearances after undergoing major emergency reconstructive surgery on his face.

Later life
By the 1990s, Hull was seen less frequently on TV, although he continued to appear in pantomime and television commercials. He won the 1993 "Pipe Smoker of the Year" award. Nonetheless, his name remained well known, and comedians Richard Herring and Stewart Lee included a "not Rod Hull" character in their 1996 television sketch show Fist of Fun, played by the actor Kevin Eldon. This character was performed as a grotesque imitation of Hull and was finally unmasked by the real Rod Hull who appeared (minus Emu) in the last episode of the series. It was to be Hull's penultimate television appearance.

A 2003 Channel 4 documentary, Rod Hull: A Bird in the Hand, suggested that Hull nursed an increasing resentment towards his puppet, believing that the success of the bird prevented him from pursuing other avenues in show business. He saw himself, according to the makers of the programme, as a talented performer who could have developed a more varied career in the entertainment industry had he not been repeatedly forced to play the 'and Emu' role. Hull once complained, "I want to write but Emu doesn't leave me the time. I want to be a comedian in my own right, but again Emu won't let me do it."

Personal life
Hull married his first wife Sandra in 1958; they had two daughters, Deborah and Danielle.

He was a fan of the football club Bristol Rovers, and he recorded a song called "Bristol Rovers All the Way" in 1974, with the squad of that time.

In the late 1980s Hull bought Restoration House in Rochester for £270,000 but the cost of renovations and an unpaid tax bill resulted in bankruptcy in 1994. Hull's second wife, Cher Hylton-Hull, already had a daughter, Catrina, and the couple had three children together: Toby, Amelia, and Oliver. Catrina appeared in his Pink Windmill show. Cher, who had been instrumental in his success, moved to her home country of Australia with the children while Hull remained in England and relocated to a shepherd's cottage in East Sussex.

Death
On the night of 17 March 1999, Hull was trying to adjust the television aerial on the roof of his bungalow at half-time during an Inter Milan vs. Manchester United Champions League match, when he slipped and fell through an adjoining greenhouse. He suffered a severe skull fracture and chest injuries, and was pronounced dead on arrival at hospital in Hastings, aged 63. Following an inquest, the coroner recorded a verdict of accidental death.

Legacy
Prior to Hull's death, Lee and Herring had planned to revive their "not Rod Hull" character for their contemporary series, This Morning with Richard Not Judy, but although they filmed several sketches – in which the character would die after performing a pointless stunt – the footage was never used.  Instead, the final episode of the second and final series of This Morning with Richard Not Judy concluded with a post-credits sketch featuring Kevin Eldon's Rod Hull character, fading out to a simple dedication reading "This series is dedicated to Rod Hull."

Hull and Emu were also the subject of the song "No One Knew the Real Emu" by The Toy Dolls (2004).

Upon Hull's death, Michael Parkinson reminisced that he had found him to be "a very charming, intelligent, and sensitive man – quite unlike the Emu." He observed that the puppet "was the dark side of Rod's personality, and very funny, provided it was not on top of you."

His son Toby brought Emu out of retirement for the first time since his father's death during the 2003 pantomime season, appearing in Cinderella at the Theatre Royal, Windsor. Toby Hull and Emu appeared in their own series on CITV.

In June 2018, Phil Fletcher famous for his Hacker T. Dog creation for CBBC bought one of the last remaining Emu puppets for £8,860 at Chippenham Auction Rooms in Wiltshire.

Hull also made an appearance in the strategy map game Hearts of Iron IV as an easter egg as the leader of the Australian Non-Aligned party, and the country's name becomes the Emu Empire.

See also

Bernie Clifton, contemporary comedian with ostrich puppet based comedy routine
Arthur! and the Square Knights of the Round Table, Australian series for which Hull was a writer.

References

External links
 The Rod Hull Tribute Website
 BFI: List of series made
 Sausage.net: Emu's Broadcasting Company
 

1935 births
1999 deaths
20th-century English comedians
20th-century English screenwriters
20th-century English male actors
Accidental deaths from falls
Accidental deaths in England
British male television writers
Butlins Redcoats
English male comedians
English male television actors
English puppeteers
English television writers
Male actors from Kent
People from the Isle of Sheppey